Island is an Iranian Drama Series directed by Siroos Moghaddam.

Plot 
Jazireh is not a place, it is an excuse for conflict between people who seek their destiny in it, and it is the basis for the efforts of those who decide to have a greater share in life; They do everything to reach the island.

Storyline 
Sahra (Shadi Mokhtari), a daring journalist who has failed and been humiliated in love, makes adventurous decisions in pursuit of equality with Arshad Shahang (Amir Maghare), his lover from a noble and wealthy family, and enters into a complex business relationship that changes his life and that of Shahang's family.

Cast 
 Amir Maghare as Arshad Shahang
 Mohammad-Reza Foroutan as Shahed Shahang
 Shadi Mokhtari as Sahra Sarraf
 Hesam Manzour as Saeed
 Kazem Sayahi as Payam
 Elsa Firouz Azar as Mahak Shahang
 Hengameh Ghaziani as Azin
 Ghazal Shakeri as Narges
 Samiyeh Lak as Shakiba Shahang
 Mitra Hajjar as Mahshid
 Zoheir Yari as Ardalan
 Akbar Zanjanpour as Karim Shahang
 Hamidreza Pegah as Razi
 Amir Kazemi as AmirHossein
 Bita Farrahi as Ziba
 Shirin Bina as Mother of Sahra
 Pourandokht Mahiman as Grandmother of Sahra
 Shahrooz Delafkar as Ashkan
 Pavan Afsar as Soha
 Mina Vahid as Golrokh

References

External links
 
 Island at Filimo
  Island  Official website

2020s Iranian television series
Iranian television series